The 1968 Eastern Michigan Hurons football team represented Eastern Michigan University as an independent during the 1968 NCAA College Division football season. In their second season under head coach Dan Boisture, the Hurons compiled an 8–2 record and outscored their opponents, 248 to 91. On November 2, 1968, the Hurons played their final homecoming day game at Walter O. Briggs Field, which had been the team's home since 1938.  Playing before a record crowd of 15,451, the Hurons defeated Northeastern, 41–0. On November 9, 1968, the Hurons played their final game at Briggs Field, a 34-7 victory over Northern Iowa.  Briggs Field was razed in 1972 to make room for expanded parking facilities.

Schedule

References

Eastern Michigan
Eastern Michigan Eagles football seasons
Eastern Michigan Hurons football